Vladimir Nikolaevich Pchelintsev (30 August 1919  27 July 1997) was a Soviet sniper during World War II. Awarded the title Hero of the Soviet Union in 1942 for killing 152 enemy soldiers, he took part in a Soviet delegation with Lyudmila Pavlichenko to the United States. In one of his memoirs he claimed to have a tally of 456 enemy soldiers killed, although most historians believe the tally is around 152 kills.

Early life
Pchelintsev was born on 20 August 1919 in Tambov. During his upbringing his family relocated to Moscow, Leningrad, and Yaroslavl before settling in Karelia in 1936, where he graduated from his tenth grade of school in 1938. From then until 1941 he studied at the Leningrad Mining Institute; during his studies he attended sniper training with the Osoaviakhim starting in 1939, becoming a marksman 1st class on 22 February 1940 and receiving the title Master of Sports of the USSR in March.

World War II
Upon the German invasion of the Soviet Union in June 1941, Pchelintsev worked in defense construction in Karelia until volunteering for the Red Army in July 1941. Initially he was assigned to the 83rd NKVD Fighter Battalion, tasked with patrolling streets in Leningrad. In September he was sent to the front lines of the war as commander of reconnaissance platoon in the 5th Rifle Battalion of the 11th Separate Rifle Brigade; that month he opened his sniper tally after shooting two advancing German soldiers. In January 1942 he was transferred to the 2nd Separate Battalion within the same brigade, where he was also tasked with sniper duties and played a role in establishing the sniper movement on the Leningrad Front. On 6 February 1942 he was awarded the title Hero of the Soviet Union for his first 102 kills, and he received the gold star medal at a meeting of other Leningrad snipers in Smolny in on 22 February. From July to August 1942 he taught at the Central School of Sniper instructors, where he trained 45 new snipers. Later that year he and Lyudmila Pavlichenko were sent as part of a Soviet diplomatic delegation to visit the United States, Canada, and England. After returning to the Soviet Union he remained in the military but was not returned to the front lines. From January 1943 to February 1944 he headed a ballistic laboratory research station at a sniper school, and in October he graduated from the Vystrel course, and in January 1945 he was made assistant to the head for the department for repatriation of foreign citizens. Reliable sources estimate he killed 150 to 154 enemy soldiers and trained 45 new snipers, although Pchelintsev claimed in his memoir to have a tally of 456.

Postwar
Having left of office for repatriation of foreign citizens in 1947, he remained in the military and went on to graduate from the Military Academy of Communications in May 1952. From June 1952 to February 1954 he served as senior engineer for airborne radio equipment at the Fighter Aviation Defense Training Center in Volodarsk. He then became senior engineer for experimental radio technical stations at the headquarters for Soviet Fighter Aviation Defense, where he remained until May 1954, having become an assistant to a permanent member of the country's Scientific and Technical Committee of the Air Force. He left that post in May 1955 before becoming deputy head of the department for radio and technical service for the Air Force Northern Group of Forces, based in Poland. From March 1959 to December 1960 he was head of the radio engineering department of Air Defense Forces in the headquarters of the Baltic Military District, and from then to 1964 he was head of radio countermeasures department of operational command in the same headquarters. In September 1964 he became head of the electronic warfare department of the Air Defense General Staff, and from December 1968 to March 1975 he was the Head of the Electronic Warfare Service of Air Defense General Staff. During those postings he headed groups of Soviet specialists in electronic warfare visiting Eastern bloc states, traveling to Vietnam in 1968 and Egypt in 1970. He also went to Egypt in 1975 as an electronic warfare planning consultant. After retiring from the military with the rank of colonel in 1976 he served as 1st Deputy Chairman of the Federation of Shooting Sports of the USSR and the Chairman of the Central Council of the All-Union "Sniper" Club. He died in Zarya, Moscow Oblast on 22 July 1997 and was buried in the Nikolo-Arkhangelsk cemetery.

Awards
 Hero of the Soviet Union (6 February 1942)
 Order of Lenin (6 February 1942)
 Order of the Patriotic War 1st class (11 March 1985)
 Order of the Red Star (30 December 1956)
 Order "For Service to the Homeland in the Armed Forces of the USSR" 3rd class (20 April 1956)
 campaign and jubilee medals

References

1919 births
1997 deaths
Soviet military snipers
Heroes of the Soviet Union
Recipients of the Order of Lenin
Recipients of the Order of the Red Star